Benzene Convention, 1971 is  an International Labour Organization Convention.

It was established in 1971:
Having decided upon the adoption of certain proposals with regard to protection against hazards arising from benzene,...

Ratifications
As of January 2023, the convention has been ratified by 38 countries (Luxembourg being the most recent in 2008).

External links 
Text.
Ratifications.

Health treaties
International Labour Organization conventions
Treaties concluded in 1971
Treaties entered into force in 1973
Treaties of Bolivia
Treaties of Bosnia and Herzegovina
Treaties of Brazil
Treaties of Chile
Treaties of Colombia
Treaties of Croatia
Treaties of the Czech Republic
Treaties of Ivory Coast
Treaties of Ecuador
Treaties of Finland
Treaties of France
Treaties of West Germany
Treaties of Greece
Treaties of Guinea
Treaties of Guyana
Treaties of the Hungarian People's Republic
Treaties of India
Treaties of Ba'athist Iraq
Treaties of Israel
Treaties of Italy
Treaties of Kuwait
Treaties of Lebanon
Treaties of Luxembourg
Treaties of Malta
Treaties of Montenegro
Treaties of Morocco
Treaties of Nicaragua
Treaties of the Socialist Republic of Romania
Treaties of Serbia and Montenegro
Treaties of Slovakia
Treaties of Slovenia
Treaties of Francoist Spain
Treaties of Switzerland
Treaties of Syria
Treaties of North Macedonia
Treaties of Uruguay
Treaties of Zambia
Treaties of Czechoslovakia
Occupational safety and health treaties
Chemical safety
1971 in labor relations